Maria Margarida de Lorena, Duchess of Abrantes (2 February 1713 – 1780) was the daughter of Dom Rodrigo de Mello (1688–1713), second child of Nuno Álvares Pereira de Melo, 1st Duke of Cadaval  and of Ana Maria Catarina Henriqueta de Lorena, 1st Duchess of Abrantes.

Biography 

On 22 December 1726, Maria Margarida married uncle, Joaquim Francisco de Sá Almeida e Menezes, 2nd Marquis of Abrantes (her mother's younger brother), who died in 1756.

King Joseph I of Portugal elevated the Dowager Marchioness to the title and degree of Duchess of Abrantes vitalício (by Royal Decree of 1757) upon her appointment as HM the Queen's Mistress of the Robes (Camareira-Môr ). This was the highest position in the Portuguese court for a lady, and one which her mother previously held.

On 20 February 1757, she married secondly João da Bemposta, natural son of the Infante Francisco, and her husband was raised to the style and degree of Duke on 18 May 1757.

When her mother, the duchess Ana Maria, died in 1765, Maria Margarida succeeded to her hereditary titles as 4th Marchioness of Abrantes and 10th Countess of Penaguião.

Maria Margarida had no issue from either marriage, and her hereditary titles devolved upon her 2nd cousin Pedro de Lancastre da Silveira de Castelo-Branco Sá e Menezes (1762–1828), 7th Count of Vila Nova de Portimão.

See also 
 Dukedoms in Portugal
 Marquis of Abrantes
 Count of Penaguião

Bibliography
"Nobreza de Portugal e do Brasil" – Vol. II, page 206. Published by Zairol Lda., Lisbon 1989.

Notes

External links
 Genealogy of Maria Margarida de Lorena, Duchess of Abrantes 

1713 births
1780 deaths
Portuguese nobility
202
18th-century Portuguese people
Portuguese ladies-in-waiting